Rabbit Hood is a 1949 Merrie Melodies cartoon released on December 24, 1949. The entry was directed by Chuck Jones and written by Michael Maltese, and features Bugs Bunny.

Plot
There is a wall covered with anti-poaching notices and wanted posters of Robin Hood and Little John. Bugs is trying to silence an alarm attached to a carrot he just pulled out of the King's Carrot Patch. He is caught by the Sheriff of Nottingham and is about to be put to the rack when Little John (depicted as a fat goonish fellow) appears and introduces Robin Hood. However, Robin Hood does not appear. Bugs and the Sheriff continue to converse, and Bugs averts the latter's attention by lying about the king's arrival ("Hail, the king approacheth!"). Bugs clubs the Sheriff while the latter is bowing and runs off.

While examining the garden wall in an attempt to scale it, Bugs is chased by the Sheriff up to the Royal Rose Garden, which the Sheriff regards as "royal ground". Here, Bugs dupes the Sheriff once again by acting as a real estate agent and successfully selling the land to the Sheriff, who plans to turn the garden into a "six-room Tudor". The Sheriff builds the house to half-completion before he realizes that he has been tricked and, now infuriated, declares revenge, all the while hitting himself on the head with a hammer ("Oooooh, I hate myself! I do! I do! I do!").

The Sheriff shoots an arrow which grazes Bugs while he is scaling the garden wall. Bugs falls into Little John's hands, who again attempts to introduce Robin Hood, but again, he does not appear. Bugs then uses the opportunity to introduce Little John and the Sheriff to each other several times over, diverting the Sheriff's attention once again. During the exchange, the Sheriff spies Bugs leaving and angrily shrugs off Little John. Bugs convinces the Sheriff that the King is indeed coming while the Sheriff tries not to be fooled once again. But when the Sheriff turns to prove to himself that Bugs is just lying, he is surprised to see Bugs dressed first as a clarion player and then as a royal crier before reappearing as the King. The Sheriff recognizing Bugs as the King, obligingly bows down. The famous knighting scene ensues, the titles getting progressively more nonsensical. Afterwards, the Sheriff, already dazed from the repeated hits, sings "London Bridge Is Falling Down" and falls on a cake quickly baked by Bugs during the song.

Bugs hears Little John once again introducing Robin Hood, but Bugs interrupts and mocks Little John, remembering Robin's failure to appear the first two times. This time however, Little John tells Bugs not to "talk mean like that", as this time, he is telling the truth, and Robin indeed appears (played by Errol Flynn, in live-action footage from The Adventures of Robin Hood). But Bugs brushes it off saying "Nah that's silly, it couldn't be him."

Production notes
Rabbit Hood is the last Warner Bros. cartoon released during creator Leon Schlesinger's lifetime.

Rabbit Hood is one of the few Bugs Bunny cartoons to receive a Blue Ribbon reissue. Strangely, while the shorts' technical credits remain, the Bugs Bunny in card before the title card was removed. Hot Cross Bunny, Knights Must Fall and Homeless Hare are the other three cartoons with this distinction.

Rabbit Hood is the origin of the infamous "knighting" exchange, where Bugs Bunny is dressed up like a king, and proceeds to pound the Sheriff's head with his sceptre while dispensing an oddball title with each strike:

Sheriff: bows
Bugs: "In the name of my most Royal Majesty, I knight thee: (strikes Sheriff over the head with his sceptre) Arise! Sir Loin of Beef." 
(strike) "Arise! Earl of Cloves."
(strike) "Arise! Duke of Brittingham."
(strike) "Arise! Baron of Munchausen."
(strike) "Arise! Essence of Myrrh,"
(strike) "Milk of Magnesia,"
(strike) "Water of Tyne...."
Sheriff: (dazed, slurred, but still on his feet) "You are too kind, your majesty."
Bugs: (to the viewers) "Got lots of stamina!"

The cartoon ends with the appearance of "the real" Robin Hood in the form of a clip from the classic 1938 movie, which starred Errol Flynn. He received a personal copy of this film in exchange for the right to use his earlier image.

Rule, Britannia! (1740) is used here as a satirical motif to mock English pretension.

The film's music takes advantage of the similarities between the fanfare of the Middle Ages and the reveille. The oafish Little John uses a tiny trumpet to sound a standard reveille tune. Later, Bugs disguised as a page plays another reveille melody, First Call, often used at the start of horse races, where it is also known as "Call to the Post". The sound and effect is similar to the tune used in A Knight for a Day (1946).

Rabbit Hood is also included with Robin Hood Daffy in the "Special Features" of the 2003 two-DVD Special Edition release of The Adventures of Robin Hood. Both are also included on the Blu-ray disc release of the film.  It is also one of three Bugs Bunny shorts included as special features on the 2014 DVD release of Rankin/Bass Productions' animated version of The Hobbit (along with Knight-mare Hare and Knighty Knight Bugs), made possible by Warner Bros.' acquisition of much of the Rankin-Bass home video library.

The phrase "Sir Loin of Beef" is used again to name one of King Arthur's knights in Knighty Knight Bugs, co-starring Yosemite Sam.

The reference to Duke of Brittingham was an in-joke. According to former Warner's writer Lloyd Turner in an interview, Brittingham's was a bar across the street from the Warner Animation offices.

See also
Robin Hood Daffy (1958)
Wagon Heels (1945)

Sources

References

External links

1949 films
1949 short films
1949 animated films
1940s Warner Bros. animated short films
Merrie Melodies short films
Robin Hood films
Robin Hood parodies
Short films directed by Chuck Jones
Short films with live action and animation
Warner Bros. short films
Warner Bros. Cartoons animated short films
Bugs Bunny films
Films with screenplays by Michael Maltese
Films scored by Carl Stalling
1940s English-language films